Congregation Yetev Lev D'Satmar is a large Satmar Hasidic synagogue located at Rodney Street in Williamsburg, Brooklyn. It was constructed to replace the previous main Satmar synagogue on Bedford Avenue, which could no longer accommodate its growing membership. It is now the main synagogue for followers of Zalman Teitelbaum, son of the deceased Satmar rebbe Moshe Teitelbaum.

The monument of the Sigeter Rebbe, Yekusiel Yehuda Teitelbaum (1808–1883), spells Yetev with two yuds, whereas the Congregation Yetev Lev D'Satmar on Rodney Street spells Yetev with only one.

See also
Congregation Yetev Lev D'Satmar (Hooper Street, Brooklyn)

References

External links
קהל יטב לב דסאטמאר (in Yiddish)

Hasidic Judaism in New York City
Hasidic synagogues
Orthodox synagogues in New York City
Satmar (Hasidic dynasty)
Synagogues in Brooklyn
Williamsburg, Brooklyn
Yiddish culture in New York City